Aihara may refer to:

 Aihara (surname), a Japanese surname
 , a village in Machida, Tokyo, Japan
 Aihara Station, a railway station in Machida